Dan Gamble is a Scottish rugby union player for Edinburgh in the Pro14. Gamble's primary position is prop.

Rugby Union career

Professional career

Gamble is a member of Edinburgh's rugby academy. He made his debut for Edinburgh in Round 5 of the 2020–21 Pro14 against Cardiff Blues.

External links
Ultimate Rugby Profile

References

Living people
People educated at Merchiston Castle School
Edinburgh Rugby players
Rugby union props
Year of birth missing (living people)
Scottish rugby union players
Rugby union players from Kelso